Era Uma Vez... Ao Vivo is the 8th album and the first live release of Brazilian singing duo Sandy & Junior. It's a recording from the duo's Eu Acho Que Pirei Tour, and it was filmed and recorded in São Paulo. It's their first record to achieve one million copies sold. 

To maintain their status as teen idols, most of their older songs were excluded from the final recording, although they were sang during the Eu Acho Que Pirei Tour. There was also a cover of the Titanic's theme, My Heart Will Go On, originally performed by Celine Dion.

Besides the live tracks, three studio tracks were also added. The first Portuguese language version of "My Heart Will Go On", entitled "Em Cada Sonho (O Amor Feito Flecha)". The second is "Cadê Você Que Não Está", and the third is "No Fundo do Coração", a version of "Truly Madly Deeply", by Savage Garden.

Track listing

References

External links 
 Era Uma Vez... Ao Vivo at Discogs

Sandy & Junior albums
1998 albums
Dance-pop albums by Brazilian artists
Portuguese-language albums